The 1907–08 season was the fifth season in Bradford City A.F.C.'s history and the fifth successive in the Second Division since their election to the league in 1903.

Background

Bradford City had been elected to the Football League in 1903, since when they had played in the Second Division. They finished 10th in their first season in the league, and followed it with two further mid-table positions. Their best position in the first four seasons came in 1906–07, manager Peter O'Rourke's first full campaign having replaced Robert Campbell in November 1905. He led City to fifth position in 1906–07, helped by a record of 10 victories from their final 14 games of the campaign.

Review

Pre-season
O'Rourke added to his squad which finished the previous season with a string of victories by signing Scottish national goalkeeper Willie Muir from Dundee, centre forward Sam Higginson from Reading and left half Harry Hanger from Kettering Town.

September
Bradford started the season by winning 8–1 at home against Chesterfield, the first time the club had scored more than six goals in a league game. Wally Smith's four goals in the match was also the first time any City player had managed the feat. Despite losing the second game of the season at Burnley, Bradford responded with 1–0 and 3–0 successes against Oldham Athletic and Clapton Orient.

Match results

Legend

Football League Second Division

Source: Frost

FA Cup

Source:Frost

A.  All attendances are approximate.

League table

Player details
Source: Frost

See also
1907–08 in English football

References

Bibliography

Bradford City A.F.C. seasons
Bradford City A.F.C.